Wim van der Gaag (born 14 July 1936 in Rotterdam) is a retired professional association football player in the Netherlands and in Australia, known for his frequent change of teams. Van der Gaag's position was forward. Later, he became a manager of amateur clubs and a football reporter for various radio stations.

Football career

Player 
Wim van der Gaag played in his youth in the now-defunct RFC Rotterdam.

In 1954 he turned professional in the short-lived NBVB league, scoring the second goal of BVC Rotterdam on 7 November 1954, in a game that ended in a 2–3 loss against BVC Den Haag. In 1954–55 Van der Gaag played for SBV Vitesse, scoring 2 goals that season. In 1955–56, at SC Emma, he was the top scorer with Janus van der Gijp, both scoring 7 goals. In 1957?–59?, Van der Gaag played at BVV in the Eredivisie. Late August 1959, Van der Gaag scored the first two goals in the BVV 0–4 victory over SBV Excelsior.

He continued to the Australian sides Sydney Austral, Sydney FC Prague, Pan Hellenic Sydney, South Coast United (1961–62), and Ringwood Wilhelmina.

Back in the Netherlands, at AGOVV Apeldoorn (1966–67), Van der Gaag was instrumental in its 2–0 victory against Excelsior Rotterdam on 14 August 1966, this time scoring only one of two goals. At PEC Zwolle (1967–68), he scored both goals in its 2–1 national cup victory against Zwolsche Boys on 31 December 1967. The victory was especially sweet as it was against PEC's urban rival.

Manager 
Van der Gaag managed CDN Driebergen, Amsvoorde Amersfoort, VV Lunteren, WVC Winterswijk, AD Aalten, SV Steenderen and SDOUC Ulft.

Personal
Wim is the father of football player and manager Mitchell van der Gaag (born 1971) and the grandfather of footballers Jordan van der Gaag (1999) and Luca van der Gaag (2001).

References

1936 births
Dutch footballers
SC Emma players
FC Den Bosch players
AGOVV Apeldoorn players
PEC Zwolle players
SBV Vitesse players
Dutch football managers
Dutch sports announcers
Footballers from Rotterdam
South Coast United players
Ringwood City SC players
Sydney FC Prague players
Sydney Olympic FC players
Living people
Association footballers not categorized by position